Common names: advanced snakes.
The Alethinophidia are an infraorder of snakes that includes all snakes other than blind snakes and thread snakes. Snakes have long been grouped into families within Alethinophidia based on their morphology, especially that of their teeth. More modern phylogenetic hypotheses using genetic data support the recognition of 19 extant families (see below), although the taxonomy of alethinophidian snakes has long been debated, and ultimately the decision whether to assign a particular clade to a particular Linnaean rank (such as a superfamily, family, or subfamily) is arbitrary.

Etymology 

Fossil record 
Fossils of alethinophidians were found in Cenomanian (Middle Cretaceous) sites of Wadi Milk Formation in Wadi Abu Hashim, Sudan. Coniophis presents the vertebral morphology similar to modern-day Aniliidae. Two extinct families from the same location, the Anomalophiidae and Russellophiidae, also belong to the Alethinophidia. Krebsophis is the earliest russellophiid. The family Nigerophiidae includes both aquatic Nubianophis from Wadi Abu Hashim and Nigerophis from the Palaeocene of Niger. The genus Eoanilius (belongs to Aniliidae) appeared in the Eocene. It is also existed in Oligocene and early Miocene.

Systematics 
 Superfamily Amerophidia
 Family: Aniliidae Stejneger, 1907—red pipesnake
 Family: Tropidophiidae Brongersma, 1951—Caribbean dwarf "boas" or thunder snakes
 Superfamily Booidea
 Family: Boidae Gray, 1825—boas (see article for comments on former families or subfamilies Calabariidae/inae, Sanziniidae/inae, Charinidae/inae, Erycidae/inae, Candoiidae/inae)
 Superfamily Pythonoidea
 Family: Pythonidae Fitzinger, 1826—pythons
 Family: Loxocemidae Cope, 1861—Mexican burrowing pythons
 Family: Xenopeltidae Bonaparte, 1845—sunbeam snakes
 Superfamily Uropeltoidea
 Family: Uropeltidae Müller, 1832—shield-tailed snakes
 Family: Cylindrophiidae Fitzinger, 1843—Asian pipe snakes
 Family: Anomochilidae Cundall, Wallach and Rossman, 1993—dwarf pipe snakes
 Family: Bolyeriidae Hoffstetter, 1946—Splitjaw snakes
 Family: Xenophidiidae Wallach & Günther, 1998—Spine-jawed snakes
 Family: Acrochordidae Bonaparte, 1831—wart or file snakes
 Family: Xenodermidae Oppel, 1811—odd-scaled snakes
 Family: Pareidae Oppel, 1811—snail-eating snakes
 Family: Viperidae Oppel, 1811—vipers (including pit vipers)
 Subfamily: Azemiopinae Liem, Marx and Rabb, 1971—Fea's viper
 Subfamily: Crotalinae Oppel, 1811—pitvipers (including rattlesnakes)
 Subfamily: Viperinae Oppel, 1811—true vipers
 Family: Homalopsidae Günther, 1864—Asian mudsnakes
 Superfamily: Elapoidea F. Boie, 1827 (merged with Colubroidea by the Reptile Database)
 Family: Cyclocoridae Weinell & Brown, 2017—Philippine snakes
 Family: Elapidae F. Boie, 1827—Cobras, coral snakes, mambas, taipans, sea snakes, and others
 Family: Pseudaspididae Cope, 1893—mole snake, western keeled snake, and mock vipers
 Family: Prosymnidae Gray, 1849—shovel-snouted snakes
 Family: Psammophiidae Dowling, 1967—sand snakes and allies
 Family: Atractaspididae Günther, 1858—African burrowing asps, stiletto snakes, harlequin snakes
 Family: Pseudoxyrhophiidae Dowling, 1975—Malagasy hognose snakes, brook snakes, and allies
 Family: Lamprophiidae Fitzinger, 1843—lamprophiids
 Superfamily: Colubroidea Oppel, 1811
 Family: Colubridae Oppel, 1811—colubrids, typical snakes (subfamilies sometimes considered distinct families)
 Subfamily: Sibynophiinae Dunn, 1928—hinged-teeth snakes
 Subfamily: Natricinae Bonaparte, 1838—keelbacks
 Subfamily: Pseudoxenodontinae McDowell, 1987
 Subfamily: Dipsadinae Bonaparte, 1838

See also
 Scolecophidia, blind snakes, thread snakes.
 List of snakes, overview of all snake genera.

References

External links

 Alethinophidia at Palaeos. Accessed 14 August 2007.

 
Cenomanian first appearances
Extant Cretaceous first appearances
Taxa named by Franz Nopcsa von Felső-Szilvás